Richard Worsam Meade II (May 21, 1807 – April 16, 1870) (also called Richard Worsam Meade, Sr., in relation to his son, Rear Admiral Richard Worsam Meade III) was an officer in the United States Navy.

Life and career
Meade was born in Cádiz, Spain on May 21, 1807 to American parents, Richard Worsam Meade I and his wife Margaret Coats Butler Meade; his younger brother was Major General George Gordon Meade, the victor of Gettysburg.

Meade entered the Navy as a midshipman in April 1826, appointed from the state of Pennsylvania. During the next decade he served in a number of ships, among them the frigate Brandywine (during the later 1820s and early 1830s) and sloop-of-war Saint Louis (in the mid-1830s). He was promoted to lieutenant in December 1837 and was subsequently assigned to the U.S. Coast Survey, the New York Navy Yard, the steamer Fulton and storeship Erie. 

Beginning in the mid-1840s his Navy service became intermittent, with a long period of "waiting orders" broken in 1847 by assignment to the steamer Scourge. Lieutenant Meade resigned his commission in December 1851, but was again in service in 1854–1855 as commanding officer of the steamship Massachusetts, part of the Pacific Squadron. He once more left the Navy in September 1855.

Meade returned to active duty during the Civil War and was given the rank of commander, apparently backdated to September 1855. He commanded the receiving ship at New York (the old ship-of-the-line North Carolina) into 1864. Promoted to captain (in 1864, with the date of rank again apparently backdated, this time to July 1862), he was commanding officer of the steam frigate San Jacinto until she was wrecked in the Bahamas at the beginning of 1865.

After the war, Meade became a member of the Military Order of the Loyal Legion of the United States.

Captain Meade appears to have had no further active employment. He was retired in December 1867 and died at Brooklyn, New York, on April 16, 1870. He is buried in Philadelphia at St. Mary's Roman Catholic Church, with his wife and several relatives.  He was the father of Richard Worsam Meade III.

Notes

1807 births
1870 deaths
Union Navy officers
American expatriates in Spain
Meade family